Kandangi is a type of saree made from cotton in the Indian state of Tamil Nadu.

Chettinad and Koorainad are two regions in Tamil Nadu that adopt traditional Kandangi style. However, many new types of Kandangi were introduced by the Tamil Nadu government. Kandangi saree received a geographical Indicator tag on 30 August 2019.

Koorainad style 

Koorai saree is a modified version of Kandangi which is traditionally made from silk and cotton threads. They are made in the Koorainad region (also known as Orur Oranad or Koranad) which is located near Mayavaram (Mayiladuthurai). A Koorai saree weighs around 7-9 kejams.

Chettinad style 

The Chettinadu Kandangi saree, introduced by the Nagarathar community, is native to the town of Karaikudi. 

This style of saree, which has 2 borders and is checkered at its centre, has existed for over 250 years. 

A Chettinad style saree is usually 48 inches wide and 216 inches long, and usually made with maroon, mustard, and black colors. Based on the findings by NIFT scholars on a Kandangi saree, which was made using an old variety of thread (i.e., 40s x 40s) in 1920, it is believed that sarees currently manufactured in Karaikudi by using 60se x 60se thread are modified versions of the Chettinad Kandangi.

References

Saris